Eugene Gordon may refer to:

 Eugene Gordon (writer) (1891–1972), Harlem Renaissance writer, painter, and publisher
 Eugene Andrew Gordon (1917–2002), American federal judge
 Eugene I. Gordon (1930–2014), American physicist
 Eugene C. Gordon, railroad construction engineer and Confederate officer in the Civil War

See also
Eugene Gordon Lee (1933–2005), American child actor